Dina Pugliese (born May 22, 1974) is a Canadian television personality, formerly the co-host of City Toronto's Breakfast Television. She joined the show in 2006, replacing Liza Fromer.

Born in Toronto, Pugliese grew up in Woodbridge, Ontario and is of Italian descent. She is a graduate of York University (Sociology and Mass Communications) and Humber College (Journalism). Prior to joining Breakfast Television, she began her career as a producer of Global Television Network's The Bynon Show and Toronto 1's Toronto Today, later becoming an entertainment reporter and host of The A-List and Star!'s Star! Daily. She has also hosted MuchMusic's MuchMusic VJ Search and Citytv's New Year's Eve special from Nathan Phillips Square. She is a past member of the Girl Guides of Canada.

Pugliese is married to Alek Mirkovich, founder of campayn.com.

On October 17, 2011, Pugliese was announced as the host of Canada's Got Talent. The first season of the show ran in 2012. In April 2020, Pugliese co-hosted a spin-off version of the show called Canadian Family's Got Talent carried out virtually by Citytv during the COVID-19 pandemic in Canada.

On February 15, 2023, Pugliese announced on air that she will be leaving the show after 16 years. Her last day on the program was February 24.

Awards

2006 – Gemini Award nomination for Best Host in a Lifestyle/Practical Information or Performing Arts Program or Series for MuchMusic VJ Search – The Series.

2023 – On February 24, 2023 she was presented a Key to the City of Vaughan by Mayor Steven Del Duca for her “outstanding contribution” to the entertainment industry.

References

External links
 Breakfast Television
 

Canadian television hosts
Canadian women television hosts
People from Vaughan
York University alumni
Humber College alumni
Canadian people of Italian descent
Canadian people of Calabrian descent
Living people
1974 births
Participants in Canadian reality television series